Dark Beauty is an album by American pianist Kenny Drew recorded in 1974 and released on SteepleChase.

Track listing

"Run Away" (Carstens) – 6:18
"Dark Beauty" (Drew) – 5:37
"Summernight" (Al Dubin, Harry Warren) – 4:10
"All Blues" (Miles Davis) – 6:28
"A Felicidade" (Luiz Bonfá, Antônio Carlos Jobim) – 6:00
"It Could Happen to You" (Jimmy Van Heusen, Johnny Burke) – 6:59
"Love Letters" (Victor Young, Edward Heyman) – 5:15
"Silk Bossa" (Clausen) – 5:06
"Blues Inn" (Drew) – 4:54
"In Your Own Sweet Way" (Dave Brubeck) – 7:15
"Stranger in Paradise" – 8:04

Tracks 1, 2, 4, 5, 7, 11 recorded on May 21, 1974; the rest recorded on May 22.

Personnel
Kenny Drew – piano
Niels-Henning Ørsted Pedersen – bass
Albert Heath – drums

References

SteepleChase Records albums
Kenny Drew albums
1974 albums